Košarkaški klub Vojvodina, commonly referred to as KK Vojvodina or simply Vojvodina, is a professional basketball club based in Novi Sad, Serbia, and the major part of the Vojvodina multi-sport club. The club competes in the top-tier Basketball League of Serbia.

History 
During the 2000s and early 2010s, the club was also known as Old Vojvodina to be distinguished from the dissolved and much better known town rivals Vojvodina Srbijagas. At that time, the club functioned as Vojvodina Srbijagas's reserve team. After their dissolving in 2016, Vojvodina received many their players and got promoted to the Basketball League of Serbia for the 2017–18 BLS season.

On 6 June 2022, the club elected Željko Rebrača as their new club's president.

Sponsorship naming
The club has had several denominations through the years due to its sponsorship:
 Privredna banka: 1992–1994
 Vojvodina Panšped: 1994–1995
 Vojvodina NIS NAP: 1998–1999

Players

Current roster

Club leaders 
The following are the club leaders from seasons played in the 1st-tier national championships.

Points scored  
1.  Zlatko Bolić (2,141)
2.  Aleksandar Lukić (1,328)
3.  Nikola Lazić (1,035)
4.  Miodrag Lopičić (991)
5.  Željko Radonjić (959)

Games played
1.  Aleksandar Lukić (179)
2.  Zlatko Bolić (140)
3.  Nenad Grmuša (108)
4.  Miodrag Lopičić (107)
5.  Nikola Lazić (99)

Points per game
1.  Jovan Malešević (20.9)
2.  Mirko Milićević (20.1)
3.  Slobodan Jelić (19.0)
4.  Miodrag Gušić (16.3)
5.  Slobodan Nikolić (16.2)

Coaches

  Oskar Bozo (1948)
  Vojislav Panić
  Stevan Putnik
  Geza Pastor
  Leliks Seleši
  Ladislav Demšar (1961–1964)
  Dušan Šušnjević (1964–1967)
  László Rátgéber (1967–1968)
  Ištvan Šmit
  Milutin Minja (1973–1974)
  Dragan Kecojević (1970s)
  László Mezei (1975–1976)
  Ferenc Gal (1976)
  Silvester Tóth (1976–1977)
  Dušan Ivković (1987–1990)
  Jovan Malešević (1990–1991)
  Nenad Mušikić (1991)
  Zoran Mirković (1991–1992)
  Branislav Jemč (1992)
  Borislav Džaković (1992)
  Nenad Mušikić (1993)
  Rajko Toroman (1993)
  Boško Đokić (1993–1994)
  Janko Lukovski (1994–1995)
  Goran Miljković (1995–1996)
  Jovan Malešević (1996)
  Janko Lukovski (1996–1997)
  Željko Lukajić (1997–1998)
  Ljubomir Poček (1998–1999)
  Mile Medaković (1999–2002)
  Zoran Trivan (2002–2003)
  Miodrag Bojković (2003–2004)
  Ivica Mavrenski (2004–2005)
  Vladan Dragosavac (2005–2011)
  Filip Socek (2015–2019)
  Marko Skoko (2019)
  Filip Socek (2019–2020)
  Miroslav Nikolić (2020–2022)
  Miloš Isakov Kovačević (2022–present)

Trophies and awards

Trophies
League Cup of Serbia (2nd-tier)
Winner (1): 2020–21
Yugoslav Federal B League
Winner (1): 1987–88

Notable players
  Zlatko Bolić
  Dragan Lukovski
  Veselin Petrović
  Jovo Stanojević
  Zoran Jovanović
  Dino Bilalović
  Dušan Domović Bulut

International record

References

External links
 KK Vojvodina official website 
 Profile at eurobasket.com

 
Vojvodina
Basketball teams in Yugoslavia
Basketball teams established in 1948
Sport in Novi Sad
1948 establishments in Yugoslavia